Coelogyne pandurata is a species of orchid.  It is found in Malaysia, Sumatra, Borneo and the Philippines as a large sized, hot growing epiphyte found on large trees near rivers or terrestrial with well-spaced, strongly compressed, oblong or suborbicular, sulcate pseudobulb carrying 2, apical, plicate, elliptic-lanceolate, leaves with a stout petiole that blooms in late spring-summer out of the center of new leads with up to 15 flowers on a terminal, arched to pendant, 6 to 12" [15 to 30 cm] long, racemose inflorescence. The simultaneously opening flowers are highly fragrant of honey but are short lived. This orchid needs wire basket culture as it spreads out quite rapidly and sphagnum with wood chips as media works best and the best time to repot is when the new lead emerges.

References

External links 

 Sample image of Coelogyne Pandurata 

pandurata
Flora of Brunei
Orchids of Borneo
Orchids of Sumatra
Orchids of Indonesia
Orchids of Malaysia
Orchids of the Philippines